Akane  is the Japanese word for 'deep red' (Akane, Rubia cordifolia) and is associated with red (from the red dye made from its roots) and brilliant red. Akane (written in a variety of forms) is both a female Japanese given name, ranked #9 of names to give girls in Japan, as well as a surname. In fiction, the name Akane has been used for various characters in anime, manga, games, books, and comics. Notable people with the name include:

Given name
, Japanese badminton player 
, Japanese writer
, Japanese professional wrestler 
, Japanese voice actress 
, member of the Japanese rock band Band-Maid
, Japanese ice hockey player
, Japanese actress, model and tarento
, Japanese ice hockey player
, Japanese voice actress and singer
, Japanese Olympic dressage rider
, Japanese voice actress 
, Japanese idol and model
, Japanese goalball player
, Japanese professional footballer
Akane Ogura, a Japanese manga artist
Akane Omae (born 1982), Japanese voice actress
Akane Osawa, member of the Japanese pop music duet Tomboy
, Japanese women's footballer
, Japanese actress
Akane Shibata, Japanese field hockey player
, Japanese ice hockey player
Akane Sugazaki (born 1989), Japanese pop singer and songwriter
Akane Takayanagi, member of the Japanese girl idol group SKE48
Akane Tomonaga, Japanese voice actress
, Japanese badminton player
Akane Yamaguchi, Japanese badminton player who competed in the 2012 Japan Super Series
, Japanese competitor in synchronized swimming
, Japanese rhythmic gymnast
Akane Yoshida (born 1994), Japanese weightlifter

Surname
, Japanese model and AV actress
, Japanese anime director

Fictional characters
Akane, the main heroine from the video game Akane the Kunoichi.
Akane, senior geisha portrayed by Rinko Kikuchi in the Westworld episodes "Akane no Mai" and "Phase Space."
Akane, a minor character in  Haikyū!!
Akane, a character Hikaru's younger sister in Parodius.
Akane, the fox and guardian angel from Angel Tales (Tenshi no Shippo)
Akane, the Japanese name of Whitney, a character in Pokémon
Lady Akane, a concubine in the Tales of the Otori series of books by Lian Hearn
Akane Aizawa, in Dai Sentai Goggle-V
Akane Aki, a character in the manga series Dash Kappei
Akane Asahina a classmate from the series Kanokon.
Akane Fujita, Takoyaki shop owner from the series "Pretty Cure (2004 TV series)"
Akane Higurashi, in My-HiME, and her My-Otome counterpart Akane Soir
Akane Hino, One of the main characters of the series "Smile PreCure!"
Akane Inuwaka, a character in the video game series Arcana Heart.
Akane Kimidori, in manga and anime series Dr. Slump
Akane Kiryu of Fatal Frame II
Akane Kishida from Kitchen Princess
Akane Kobayashi, in Doki Doki School Hours (Sensei no Ojikan)
Akane Kurashiki, A major character from the video game series Zero Escape
Akane Mishima, one of the main characters of Kampfer
Akane Mizuhara, a main character in the visual novel Final Approach
Akane Motomiya, a main character in the video games Harukanaru Toki no Naka de, and Harukanaru Toki no Naka de Hachiyō Shō.
Akane Nakiko, a comic book character.
Akane Narita, in Hot Gimmick
Akane Osaki, the main character of the manga series Akane-banashi
Akane Owari, a character from the Danganronpa series.
Akane Ryuuku, a roleplay character of Gumball Watterson from The Amazing World of Gumball.
Akane Sakurada, the main character of the Japanese anime and manga series Castle Town Dandelion 
Akane Sano, a main character in the manga series Black God
Akane Satomura, a main character in the visual novel One: Kagayaku Kisetsu e.
Akane Serizawa, a minor character in the anime and manga series Pani Poni.
, a character in the anime series SSSS.Gridman
Akane Sonozaki, in the anime, manga, and visual novel series Higurashi no Naku Koro ni.
Akane Suzumiya, in Akane Maniax, and Kimi ga Nozomu Eien
Akane Takigawa, in the manga and anime series Cross GameAkane Tachibana, lead character in basketball manga series I'llAkane Tendo, in manga and anime series Ranma Akane Toriyasu, a character in the video game Yandere SimulatorAkane Tsunemori, in the anime Psycho-PassAkane Yagyu, ("Jubei") from the video game, Onimusha: Dawn of DreamsAkane Yamano, a character in Dual!, A character in the manga series Haikyuu!!Akane Yashiro (played by Yumiko Shaku) was the pilot of Kiryu (Mechagodzilla) in the film Godzilla Against Mechagodzilla.

Akane Ryuzoji is a character in the comic series World's End Harem.
Akane Kino is the younger sister of the main character in the manga series Voice Over! Seiyu Academy''.
Delta Akane ( Delta Zakuro in English ) is a character in the anime Beyblade Burst GT/Gachi ( Rise in English )
Akane Kurokawa is a main character in the manga series Oshi no Ko

References

Japanese feminine given names
Japanese-language surnames